The 26th Biathlon World Championships were held in 1991 for the second time in Lahti, Finland.

Men's results

20 km individual
Date: February 24, 1991

10 km sprint
Date: February 19, 1991

Team event
Date: February 21, 1991

4 × 7.5 km relay
Date: February 23, 1991

Women's results

15 km individual
Date: February 24, 1991

7.5 km sprint
Date: February 19, 1991

Team event
Date: February 21, 1991

3 × 7.5 km relay
Date: February 23, 1991

Medal table

References

1991
Biathlon World Championships
International sports competitions hosted by Finland
1991 in Finnish sport
February 1991 sports events in Europe
Sports competitions in Lahti
Biathlon competitions in Finland